The year 2019 is the 22nd year in the history of the M-1 Global, a mixed martial arts promotion based in Russia.

List of events

M-1 Challenge/ WKG 3 - Bogatov vs. Silva

M-1 Challenge/ WKG 3 - Bogatov vs. Silva will be a mixed martial arts event held by M-1 Global on January 26, 2019 at the Nanshan Culture & Sports Center in Shenzhen, China.

Background
This event will feature a world title fight for the M-1 Lightweight Championship between the champ Roman Bogatov and top contender Michel Silva as M-1 Challenge  headliner.

Fight Card

M-1 Challenge 101 - Prikaza vs. Rakhmonov

M-1 Challenge 101 - Prikaza vs. Rakhmonov was a mixed martial arts event held by M-1 Global on March 30, 2019 at the Halyk Arena in Almaty, Kazakhstan.

Background

Results

Road To M-1 USA 2

Road To M-1 USA 2 was a mixed martial arts event held by M-1 Global on April 04, 2019 at Quechan Casino Resort in Winterhaven, California, United States.

Fight Card

Road To M-1

Road To M-1 was a mixed martial arts event held by M-1 Global on April 06, 2019 at the Chelyabinsk Palace Of Culture in Chelyabinsk, Russia.

Fight Card

M-1 Challenge 102 - Rakhmonov vs. Lacerda

M-1 Challenge 102 - Rakhmonov vs. Lacerda was a mixed martial arts event held by M-1 Global on June 28, 2019 at the Barys Arena in Nur-Sultan, Kazakhstan.

Fight Card

M-1 Challenge 103 - Pletenko vs. Kelades

M-1 Challenge 103 - Pletenko vs. Kelades was a mixed martial arts event held by M-1 Global on August 3, 2019 in Shenzhen, China.

Fight Card

M-1 Challenge 104 - Bogatov vs. Lebout

M-1 Challenge 104 - Bogatov vs. Lebout was a mixed martial arts event held by M-1 Global on August 30, 2019 at the Sports ArenA in Orenburg, Russia.

Fight Card

Road To M-1 USA 3

Road To M-1 USA 3 was a mixed martial arts event held by M-1 Global on October 11, 2019 at Paducah Convention Center in Paducah, Kentucky, United States.

Fight Card

M-1 Challenge 105 - Morozov vs. Rettinghouse

M-1 Challenge 105 - Morozov vs. Rettinghouse was a mixed martial arts event held by M-1 Global on October 19, 2019 at the Barys Arena in Nur-Sultan, Kazakhstan.

Fight Card

See also
 2019 in UFC
 2019 in Bellator MMA
 2019 in ONE Championship 
 2019 in Absolute Championship Akhmat
 2019 in Konfrontacja Sztuk Walki
 2019 in RXF

References

External links
M-1global

M-1 Global events
M-1global events
2019 in mixed martial arts
2019 sport-related lists